Ijangs are the terraced and defended settlements on hill tops and ridges in the Batanes Islands in the Philippines. These high rocky formations can serve as fortress or refuge against attacking enemies for the Ivatan people.

Background
In 1994, Eusebio Dizon, the deputy director of the National Museum of the Philippines, went to Batanes with his team for an archeological project. They found a triangular-shaped hill in Savidug, a town in Sabtang. These structures were called ijang. Ijangs are similar to the gusuku castles found in Okinawa, Japan. Aside from both of them being strategitically built in high places, 12th century Sung-type ceramics and Chinese beads and other artefactual materials recovered from an ijang were dated at almost the same time as the foundations of the Okinawan castles beginning from circa 1200 CE.

The Ivatan traditionally lived in the ijang which were fortified mountain areas and drank sugar-cane wine, or palek. They also used gold as currency and produced a thriving agriculture-based industry as well as expertise in seafaring and boat-building.

Functions

Based on oral history and tradition, pre-Hispanic Ivatans were divided into small clans that lived not far from the sea. During clan wars, those attacked climbed for safety to the tops of the ijangs where they defended themselves by throwing stones at the enemy below. The tops of the ijangs today are still full of stones - the primitive ammunition of the people. Building a shelter atop the ijang became necessary when fighting continued long for some time. Ijangs were first described by the English freebooter Captain William Dajnpier when he visited the island of Ivuhos in 1687. Today, there are still traces of such ancient dwellings, including stone posts standing or lying where the Ivatans left them when they abandoned their pagan way of life for Christianity in the late 18th century.

Due to the colonial era
In 1783, the Spanish claimed Batanes as part of the Philippines under the auspices of Governor-General José Basco y Vargas. This made its own history to be vanished rapidly. The Bashi Channel had come to be increasingly used by English East India Company ships and the Spanish authorities brought the islands under their direct administration to prevent them from falling under British control. However, the Ivatan remained on their ijangs, or mountain fortresses. 

In 1790, Governor Guerrero decreed that Ivatans were to leave their ijang and to live in the lowlands, thereby giving them more people to tax. Basco and Ivana were the first towns.

See also

 Dap-ay
 Torogan
 Bahay Kubo
 Mỹ Sơn 
 Angkor Wat
 Prambanan

References

Archaeological sites in the Philippines
Culture of Batanes
Houses in the Philippines
National Cultural Treasures of the Philippines
 01